IPL Velocity were an Indian women's cricket team. They were founded in 2019 to compete in the Women's T20 Challenge, which they competed in until the tournament ended in 2022. They reached the final of the competition twice, in 2019 and 2022, but lost both times.

History

2019
Velocity were founded in 2019 as part of the expansion of the Women's T20 Challenge, which had started in 2018 Women's T20 Challenge. They were to be captained by Mithali Raj and included overseas players Hayley Matthews, Danni Wyatt and Amelia Kerr. In their first match, Velocity beat Trailblazers by 3 wickets, with Wyatt top-scoring with 46 and Ekta Bisht and Amelia Kerr taking two wickets apiece. Velocity then lost to Supernovas in their second match, however, losing by 12 runs despite 43 from Wyatt and 40* from Mithali Raj.

Velocity still qualified for the final, finishing second on Net Run Rate. They faced Supernovas once again, batting first and scoring 121/6, mainly thanks to a 71-run partnership between Sushma Verma (40*) and Amelia Kerr (36). A half-century for opposition captain Harmanpreet Kaur, however, brought the Supernovas close, and Velocity were beaten off the final ball, which Radha Yadav hit to the boundary.

2020
The 2020 Women's T20 Challenge was delayed due to the COVID-19 pandemic, eventually getting underway in November. Velocity beat Supernovas by 5 wickets with one ball to spare in their first game, with Sune Luus top-scoring with 37*, after Ekta Bisht took 3/22 with the ball. In their second match, however, against Trailblazers, Velocity collapsed to 47 all out, with opposition bowler Sophie Ecclestone taking 4/9, and lost by 9 wickets. The damage to their Net Run Rate meant Velocity failed to qualify for the final, finishing bottom of the group.

2022
The 2022 Women's T20 Challenge took place in May 2022. Deepti Sharma replaced Mithali Raj as captain of the side. Velocity beat Supernovas in their first match of the tournament, with Shafali Verma and Laura Wolvaardt scoring half-centuires. They lost their second match, against Trailblazers, but managed to limit the damage to their Net Run Rate in order to qualify for the final. In the final, they faced Supernovas. Chasing 166 for victory, Velocity fell four runs short despite Wolvaardt's 65*.

The 2022 season proved to be the final edition of the Women's T20 Challenge, with the tournament being replaced by the Women's Premier League from the 2023 season.

Players
Final squad, 2022 season.
 No. denotes the player's squad number, as worn on the back of their shirt.
  denotes players with international caps.

Overseas players

Seasons

Women's T20 Challenge

Statistics

Women's T20 Challenge

References

Women's T20 Challenge teams